The Lotos Club was founded in 1870 as a gentlemen's club in New York City; it has since also admitted women as members. Its founders were primarily a young group of writers and critics. Mark Twain, an early member, called it the "Ace of Clubs". The Club took its name from the poem "The Lotos-Eaters" by Alfred, Lord Tennyson, which was then very popular. Lotos was thought to convey an idea of rest and harmony. Two lines from the poem were selected for the Club motto:

The Lotos Club has always had a literary and artistic bent, with the result that it has accumulated a noted collection of American paintings. Its "State Dinners" (1893 menu at right below) are legendary fetes for scholars, artists and sculptors, collectors and connoisseurs, writers and journalists, and politicians and diplomats. Elaborate souvenir menus are produced for these dinners.

History
The Lotos Club's first home was at Two Irving Place, north of 14th Street near the Academy of Music and on the site of the Consolidated Edison Building. Journalist DeWitt Van Buren was the Lotos Club's first president; he was succeeded by A. Oakey Hall. Other early Club officers included Vice President F.A. Schwab, Secretary George Hows, and Treasurer Albert Weber. New York Tribune editor Whitelaw Reid was elected Club president in 1877, at which time the Lotos Club moved to 149 Fifth Avenue at 21st Street.

In 1893, the Club moved to 556-558 Fifth Avenue at 46th Street, purchasing their first clubhouse.

It was at the Lotos Club in 1906 that George Harvey, editor of Harper's Weekly, sent up his first trial balloon by proposing Woodrow Wilson for the office of President of the United States. In 1909, with financial backing from Andrew Carnegie, the clubhouse was moved to 110 West 57th Street, in a building designed by architect Donn Barber.

Frank R. Lawrence was the Club's longest serving president, from March 1889 until his death on October 26, 1918. Lawrence was succeeded as president by Chester S. Lord, who served for five years. In 1923, Columbia University president Nicholas Murray Butler was elected president of the Club.

The Club has a long history of showing the work of its artist members and has also held exhibitions of work from the collections of its members including one in 1910 that featured works by Degas, Monet, Renoir, Cassatt, and Hassam.

In October 1941 the club held a mortgage-burning ceremony to mark payment of the $389,000 owed on the West 57th Street building. But in 1945 members began considering a move to a "simpler clubhouse." The club has been housed since 1947 in a 1900 clubhouse designed by Richard Howland Hunt at 5 East 66th Street. (The building had been commissioned by Margaret Shepard as a gift for her daughter, Mrs. William Jay Schieffelin.)

In 1977, the Club amended its constitution to admit women.

Constitution

Lotos Club Medal of Merit 
The Lotos Club issues a Medal of Merit; previous recipients include general David Petraeus, scientist James D. Watson, flautist Jean-Pierre Rampal, and puppeteer Bil Baird.

The Club also awards a Foundation Prize and an Award of Distinction.

Notable members 

 Brooke Astor
 Mikhail Baryshnikov
 Kathleen Battle
 Andrew Carnegie
 Walter P. Chrysler
 Mary Higgins Clark
 Samuel Clemens
 George M. Cohan
 Hume Cronyn
 Mario Cuomo
 David Dinkins
 Dwight D. Eisenhower
 Renee Fleming
 Gilbert and Sullivan
 Alan Gilbert
 Solomon R. Guggenheim
 William Randolph Hearst
 David M. Heyman
 Marilyn Horne
 Leslie Howard
 Alleyne Ireland
 Sir Henry Irving
 Joseph Koch
 Angela Lansbury
 Leonard Liebling
 Wynton Marsalis
 Margaret Mead
 Burgess Meredith
 Peter O'Toole
 William S. Paley
 Christopher Plummer
 Julian Rix
 Linda Saidel
 Charles M. Schwab
 Cyrus Ingerson Scofield
 Bobby Short
 Beverly Sills
 Stephen Sondheim
 Isaac Stern
 Elaine Stritch
 Susan Stroman
 Moses J. Stroock
 Arthur Hays Sulzberger
 Jessica Tandy
 J. Walter Thompson
 Orson Welles
 P. G. Wodehouse
 Tom Wolfe
 James Wolfensohn
 Frank Winfield Woolworth
 Andrew Wyeth
 Yo-Yo Ma
 James D. Watson

See also
 List of American gentlemen's clubs

Notes

External links 

 
 A Brief History of the Lotus Club (1895)
 Lotus Leaves: Stories, Essays and Poems (written by various Lotus members including Mark Twain); 1875, 1887
 Documenting the Gilded Age: New York City Exhibitions at the Turn of the 20th Century A New York Art Resources Consortium project. Exhibition catalogs from the Lotos Club.

1870 establishments in New York (state)
Clubhouses in Manhattan
Clubs and societies in the United States
Culture of New York City
Gentlemen's clubs in New York City
Organizations established in 1870
Upper East Side